Bottrel is a hamlet in southern Alberta under the jurisdiction of Rocky View County.

Bottrel features a historic general store with campground. 

Edward Botterel was an early settler who arrived in the area c. 1888. The local post office operated from December 1, 1909 to March 31, 1969, and was named after Edward Botterel despite the erroneous spelling at its adoption. The error was never corrected and the current spelling is locally used.

Demographics 
The population of Bottrel according to the 2018 municipal census conducted by Rocky View County is 5.

See also 
List of communities in Alberta
List of hamlets in Alberta

References 

Karamitsanis, Aphrodite (1992). Place Names of Alberta – Volume II, Southern Alberta, University of Calgary Press, Calgary, Alberta.
Read, Tracey (1983). Acres and Empires – A History of the Municipal District of Rocky View, Calgary, Alberta.

Rocky View County
Hamlets in Alberta
Calgary Region